"Room in Your Heart" is the third single from the British group Living in a Box's 1989 album, Gatecrashing. It rivalled the band's eponymous 1987 single as their highest-charting song. Both peaked at No. 5 on the UK Singles Chart. This song was their most successful single from Gatecrashing.

Background
According to frontman Richard Darbyshire, "Room in Your Heart" gave him a rare opportunity to display his guitar work.  Reflecting on his time in the band, Darbyshire mentioned how guitar solos were relatively incompatible with the group's often more dance-oriented material, implying that his guitar parts were often relegated to rhythm/less prominent riffing (and even on songs that did call for solos, other guitarists often performed them).  However, while Brian May performed the solo on "Blow the House Down," the group's first hit from Gatecrashing, Darbyshire asserted, "I'm quite proud of my solo on 'Room in Your Heart'", indicating that he did perform the guitar solo himself on the latter hit.

Versions
The original version of the song, featured as the final track on the Gatecrashing album, has a length of 4:28.

A slightly remixed single version appends a brief a cappella introduction, delays the start of the drum beat until Richard Darbyshire begins singing the first verse, and features enhanced drum and keyboard sounds intermittently throughout the remainder of the track. These embellishments extend the length of the song by approximately 10-12 seconds.  There are also several edited versions of the single (including the video version, which cuts out half of Darbyshire's guitar solo as well as half of the second verse).

Charts

Weekly charts

Year-end charts

Certifications

Cover versions
Streetwize, an international boyband project sang a cover version of the song during the Irish Childline 2007 charity event. Late Italian singer Mike Francis also covered the song.

In popular culture
The song was used on the American daytime serial Santa Barbara.

References

1989 singles
1989 songs
Living in a Box songs
Pop ballads
Songs written by Albert Hammond
Songs written by Richard Darbyshire